The 1997 All-Ireland Under-20 Football Championship was the 34th staging of the All-Ireland Under-21 Championship since its establishment by the Gaelic Athletic Association in 1964.

Kerry entered the championship as the defending champions, however, they were beaten by Meath in the All-Ireland semi-final.

The All-Ireland final was played on 10 May 1997 at St. Tiernach's Park in Clones, between Derry and Meath, in what was their first meeting in a final. Derry won the match by 1-12 to 0-05 to claim their second championship title overall and a first title since 1968.

References

All-Ireland Under-21 Football Championship
All-Ireland Under-21 Football Championships